The Singapore national under-19 football team is the national Under 19 association football team of Singapore. The team comes under the organization of the Football Association of Singapore (FAS).

Players were selected from the nation's National Football Academy Under-17 & 18 and S.League's Prime League squad.

Results

AFC U-19 Championship

History
The under-19 football team was formed to represent Singapore in the AFF U-19 Youth Championship since 2001. The squad finished 3rd and won Bronze in the 2010 Singapore Youth Olympic Games.

2013
The team is currently coached by Dejan Glusevic, the best youth coach in Singapore with his emphasis on passing and movement.

The Football Association of Singapore entered the team as the 'Singapore Cubs' in the 2014 Prime League in view of the 2015 Southeast Asian Games which Singapore is hosting. They are the third youth age group team to participate in the Prime League, after the NFA U-17 and U-18 teams.

Honours

Regional
 2010 Youth Olympic Games
  Bronze medal (1): 2010

Recent results

2022

Players

Current squad
The following players were called up for the AFC U20 Asian Cup Qualifiers.

Recent call-ups
These players are called up for the last 36 months.

Current coaching staff

See also
 Singapore national football team
 Singapore national youth football team
 Young Lions
 Singapore women's national football team

References

Asian national under-19 association football teams
u19